"(Just Like) Starting Over" is a song written and performed by John Lennon from the 1980 album, Double Fantasy. It was released as a single on 24 October 1980 in the United Kingdom, with Yoko Ono's "Kiss Kiss Kiss" as the B-side. It reached number one in both the US and UK after Lennon was murdered on 8 December 1980. It was Lennon's final single released in his lifetime.

Background
"(Just Like) Starting Over" was the first single released from Double Fantasy and the first new recording Lennon had released since he left the music industry in 1975. It was chosen by Lennon not because he felt it was the best track on the album, but because it was the most appropriate following his five-year absence from the recording industry. He referred to it during production as the "Elvis/Orbison" track, as he "tongue in cheek" impersonated their vocal styles; at the start of the 2010 "Stripped Down" version of the song, Lennon says "this one's for Gene, and Eddie, and Elvis... and Buddy."

Composition
Although its origins were in unfinished demo compositions like "Don't Be Crazy" and "My Life", it was one of the last songs to be completed in time for the Double Fantasy sessions. "We didn't hear it until the last day of rehearsal," producer Jack Douglas said in 2005. Lennon finished the song while on holiday in Bermuda, and recorded it at The Hit Factory in New York City just weeks later. The song was originally titled "Starting Over"; however, "(Just Like)" was added prior to its release because of its similarity to Dolly Parton's "Starting Over Again" which had topped the US Country Charts earlier in the year.  The chiming bell that opens the song was a deliberate allusion to the heavy tolling church bell that opens Lennon's 1970 song "Mother", illustrating how far Lennon had come in ten years.

While commercial releases of the song (original 45rpm singles, LPs and Compact Discs) run a length of three minutes and 54 seconds, a promotional 12" vinyl single originally issued to radio stations features a longer fadeout, officially running at four minutes 17 seconds.

Musicologist Walter Everett noted melodic similarities between a portion of the song and the Beach Boys' 1964 single "Don't Worry Baby".

Recording
Lennon recorded "(Just Like) Starting Over" on 9 August 1980 at The Hit Factory. The track was mixed at the Record Plant on 25–26 September 1980.

Release and reception
The song is Lennon's biggest solo hit in the United States, staying at number 1 for five weeks. Before Lennon was shot in New York City on 8 December 1980, the single had reached number 6 on the US charts. It reached number 1 for the week ending 27 December. Billboard ranked it at the No. 4 song for 1981. The song also reached number 1 on the Cashbox Top 100.

In the UK, it had peaked at number 8 in the charts and had fallen to position number 21 before Lennon's death propelled it to number 1. It was overtaken to the Christmas Number One Single rank by the St Winifred's School Choir's "There's No One Quite Like Grandma," finishing at number 2 on that list. By 6 January 1981, there were three Lennon songs in the UK top 5, a feat that remained unequalled for 35 years when Justin Bieber managed to accomplish this in January 2016.

Billboard magazine considered "(Just Like) Starting Over" to be an "uptempo, fresh sounding rocker," praising the "irresistible melody and lyric line," the "exceptional rhythm unit" as well as Lennon's vocal performance.  Record World said that "John steps briskly into the mainstream with this glorious pop-rocker."

In 2013, Billboard ranked it as the 62nd biggest hit of all time on the Billboard Hot 100 chart.

Ultimate Classic Rock critic Stephen Lewis rated it as Lennon's 7th greatest solo love song, saying that "The undeniably catchy rock and roll song – a tribute to past rock and rollers – appeals to ears and hearts, with a solid groove and an optimistic and wistful lyric that is honest, without becoming maudlin."

On 8 October 2010, in honor of what would have been his 70th birthday the following day, iTunes released remastered albums, iTunes LPs, and a free track, the 2010 remix of "(Just Like) Starting Over".

Charts

Weekly charts

Year-end charts

All-time charts

Certifications

Covers
The Flaming Lips recorded a version for the benefit album Instant Karma: The Amnesty International Campaign to Save Darfur.

Personnel
 John Lennon – vocals, rhythm guitar
 Earl Slick, Hugh McCracken – lead guitar
 Tony Levin – bass guitar
 George Small – keyboards
Andy Newmark – drums
Arthur Jenkins – percussion
 Michelle Simpson, Cassandra Wooten, Cheryl Manson Jacks, Eric Troyer – backing vocals

See also
List of Billboard Hot 100 number-one singles of 1980
List of Billboard Hot 100 number-one singles of 1981
List of posthumous number-one singles (UK)

References

External links
Just Like Starting Over The Recording Of Double Fantasy by Chris Hunt, published in Uncut John Lennon Special, 2005
 

1980 singles
John Lennon songs
UK Singles Chart number-one singles
Billboard Hot 100 number-one singles
Cashbox number-one singles
Number-one singles in Australia
European Hot 100 Singles number-one singles
RPM Top Singles number-one singles
Irish Singles Chart number-one singles
Number-one singles in Spain
Number-one singles in Switzerland
Songs written by John Lennon
Song recordings produced by Jack Douglas (record producer)
Song recordings produced by John Lennon
Song recordings produced by Yoko Ono
Geffen Records singles
Musical tributes to Elvis Presley
1980 songs